The Tishomingo County School District is a public school district based in Iuka, Mississippi (USA). The district serves most of Tishomingo County.

Schools
Tishomingo County High School
Iuka Middle School
Burnsville Elementary/Middle School
Iuka Elementary School
Tishomingo Elementary School
Belmont School

Demographics

2006-07 school year
There were a total of 3,327 students enrolled in the Tishomingo County School District during the 2006–2007 school year. The gender makeup of the district was 49% female and 51% male. The racial makeup of the district was 3.13% African American, 93.99% White, 2.83% Hispanic, and 0.06% Asian. 45.0% of the district's students were eligible to receive free lunch.

Previous school years

Accountability statistics

See also
List of school districts in Mississippi

References

External links
 

Education in Tishomingo County, Mississippi
School districts in Mississippi